The Washington, Brandywine & Point Lookout Railroad (WB&PL) (originally, the Southern Maryland Railroad) was an American railroad that operated in southern Maryland and Washington, D.C., from 1881 to 1954. Its single-track line connected Patuxent River in Maryland to the Pennsylvania Railroad. It operated in and out of bankruptcy and changed its name numerous times.

History

Origins
The Southern Maryland Railroad (SMR) was incorporated on March 20, 1868, “for the purpose of constructing, maintaining, and working a railroad from some point in Prince George’s County to Point Lookout.”  As was typical of the railroads of the era, the alignment of the right-of-way bisected the peninsula created by the Potomac and Patuxent rivers.  A rail line from the major north-south Potomac River crossings into Virginia near Washington, D.C., to a port on the Patuxent River near the Chesapeake Bay would be an ideal line to promote agricultural and mineral business and rail shipments from the counties of this peninsula.

  A commission was appointed, money was raised, and an engineer was hired to build an 80-mile rail line.

Washington City and Point Lookout Railroad
In 1872, a competitor railroad, the Washington City and Point Lookout Railroad was incorporated and authorized to run trains between Washington, D.C., and Point Lookout with connecting steamers to Norfolk, Virginia. It began building a line parallel to the SMR. In 1876, the SMR was investigated for defrauding the state of Maryland, the sole shareholder in the company, and went bankrupt without running a single train.

In 1878, the WC&PL was authorized to purchase the SMR but never did.

Construction was later restarted in Brandywine where the SMR connected with the Baltimore and Potomac Railroad (later the Pope's Creek branch of the Pennsylvania Railroad) and was built in a southeasterly direction. In 1881, the first train was run, serving Charlotte Hall and Mechanicsville. By 1884, the railroad had built 21 miles and graded 50 more in Maryland. They also graded and partially laid out the right-of-way for 2.2 miles of railroad from Deanwood to the Maryland line in the District of Columbia. By 1886, the railroad had laid down ties and some rail in D.C., but they never operated trains on this section, which later came under control of the Chesapeake Beach Railway.

Washington & Potomac Railroad
The line declared bankruptcy in early 1886, and emerged on April 1 of that year as the Washington & Potomac Railroad (W&P). 

In 1894, the W&P merged with the WC&PL, which was by then in receivership.

Washington, Potomac & Chesapeake Railway
In 1900, the line went through another bankruptcy and emerged on July 24, 1901, as the Washington, Potomac & Chesapeake Railway.  The WP&C had a contentious relationship with the state. In 1910, it was ordered to run two trains a day, up from one, and to drop their prices. The line had trouble fulfilling its obligations and in 1914 the state of Maryland threatened to withdraw their charter.

Washington, Brandywine & Point Lookout Railroad
At the end of 1917, the line again found itself in bankruptcy and was nearly scrapped due to the high price of scrap metal during World War I. In 1918, the state of Maryland attempted to have the U.S. government take over control of the railroad. Farmers in the area bought the line from a salvage firm and in June 1918 the line began running again, this time under the name of the Washington, Brandywine & Point Lookout Railroad.

In the 1930s, revenues were dropping due to increased competition from the automobile and the line probably would have been gone for good, except for the intervention of World War II.

Navy control
In June 1942, the U.S. Navy took over the line and extended it to the Patuxent River Naval Air Station. The name was changed again, this time to the more accurate Brandywine and Cedar Point Railroad. The Navy operated an "accommodation" train that connected with the Pennsylvania Railroad in Brandywine until the PRR stopped passenger trains on the Pope's Creek Line in 1949.

Pennsylvania Railroad control
In 1953, the railroad fell into disrepair. The extensive maintenance costs were too much to keep it in business and the Brandywine and Cedar Point was closed in 1954. The last regular run was made in July 1954 from the Naval Air Station to Hollywood, Maryland. Through the late 1950s and early 1960s, PRR trains used the line to deliver aviation fuel to the base. However, when fuel started coming in by barge, the importance of the line dwindled.

End of the line 
When train operation ceased, the line was offered for sale by the federal GSA, but there were no takers. On June 26, 1970, the St. Mary's County Commissioners purchased 28 miles of the abandoned right of way from Hughesville, Maryland, to Patuxent River, Maryland.
The tracks were removed in the mid-1970s.

Stations on the line
Original line: pre-1942
Brandywine
Cedarville
Woodville
Gallant Green
Hughesville
Oaks
Charlotte Hall
New Market
Mechanicsville (original end-of-the-line)

In 1942, the federal government took over operations of the railroad and continued to make deliveries to stops on the original route. The line was extended and these stops added.

Oakville
Laurel Grove
Forrest Hall 
Hillville
Hollywood
California
USN Pax River

After 1954: Pennsylvania Railroad operation

When the USN excessed the line in 1954 and the PRR took over operations, they delivered and took away freight shipments and occasionally carried a passenger car (USN) or caboose (also USN) for special movements to/from the Brandywine Junction, which became a Department of Defense Warehouse and shipping point until it was destroyed by fire. The Brandywine terminal was U.S. government property and was maintained by Public Works personnel from Patuxent River. The terminal was turned over to the Air Force just before it burned.

Surviving landmarks

 CSXT trackage that runs from Brandywine to Hughesville, where it connects to a spur to the Chalk Point Generating Station. These tracks are now part of CSX's Herbert Subdivision
 From Hughesville to the Patuxent River Naval Station, the railroad's right-of-way is being used to create the 28-mile Three Notch Trail. Its first mile opened on June 3, 2006; as of 2018, it had been extended to 11 miles.
 Mileposts, MP13 & W

References

External links
Map showing the Southern Maryland Railroad and its connections in 1881
Photos of railroad's artifacts
Three Notch Trail
 Map showing the Washington City and Point Lookout Railroad and its connections in 1888

Defunct Maryland railroads